David Stewart (24 October 1378 – 26 March 1402) was heir apparent to the throne of Scotland from 1390 and the first Duke of Rothesay from 1398. He was named after his great-granduncle, David II of Scotland, and also held the titles of Earl of Atholl (1398–1402) and Earl of Carrick (1390–1402). He shares with his uncle and arch-rival, Robert Stewart, first Duke of Albany, the distinction of being first dukes to be created in the Scottish peerage. David never became king. His marriage to Mary Douglas, daughter of Archibald the Grim, the third Earl of Douglas, was without issue.

Life
David Stewart, was born to John Stewart, Lord High Steward of Scotland, and his wife, Anabella Drummond, daughter Sir John Drummond, 11th Thane of Lennox, on 24 October 1378. In 1390, when his father acceded as King of Scots (taking the title Robert III), David became first in order of succession to the throne of Scotland as eldest son. He is known to have taken an active part in the political life of the kingdom. In around 1396, for example, he was entrusted with the government or pacification of the northern parts of the kingdom. He is also known to have played an active role in peace negotiations with John of Gaunt in the Marches.

Marriage contracts
In 1395 David was betrothed to Elizabeth de Dunbar, daughter of George Dunbar, 10th Earl of March. This was a strong political alliance because the Earl of March was one of the most powerful and influential men of his time, rivaled only by Archibald Douglas, 3rd Earl of Douglas. A Papal mandate for the marriage was approved but the couple had not wanted to wait and were married before the mandate arrived in August 1395. As a result they were censured. After applying for absolution for not waiting, the Pope issued a dispensation to the couple dated 10 March 1397 granting that they could ‘remarry’ after a period of separation.  

Archibald Douglas "The Grim" influenced King Robert, and instead of remarrying Elizabeth, his wife of almost 2 years, David was betrothed to and married Marjorie Douglas, daughter of the 3rd Earl of Douglas instead. Understandably, the Dunbar family were more than upset. They had lost an important political alliance to their greatest rival, Elizabeth's honor and marriage prospects were sullied and the entire family insulted. George Dunbar, Earl of March did not react favorably. As a result of the broken betrothal he left Scotland entirely and joined King Henry IV of England. This was potentially very dangerous for Scotland.

Lieutenant of Scotland
At a meeting of the Estates held in January 1399 it was resolved that David, as heir to the throne, should be appointed "lieutenant" of the kingdom with full sovereign powers for three years, partly due to the infirmity of his father and at a time of civil unrest and conflict with England. Although this gave him an opportunity to flex political muscle, his room for manoeuvre was significantly constrained, however, by a combination of youthful inexperience and the ultimately mortal rivalry of his uncle, Robert Stewart (brother of Robert III; the latter was named John before he became king), Duke of Albany, who had been protector of the kingdom prior to David's lieutenancy. Albany was a ruthlessly effective politician with a well-developed power base, and his designs on the throne were well understood. 

David appears to have had an ally in his mother, the Queen, who had worked to strengthen her son's hand, arranging the great tournament of 1398 in Edinburgh when he was knighted and being present, along with the king, in that same year when David was created Duke of Rothesay, in the same ceremony, performed by Walter Trail, Archbishop of St Andrews, which also created the title Duke of Albany for his uncle. But both the Queen and Archbishop were dead by 1401. His father, the King, appears to have had little ability by that date to influence events effectively.

Death

In late February 1402, while travelling officially to St Andrews, David was arrested just outside the city at Strathtyrum in a sting operation which had been arranged by Albany, at that time in complicit alliance with David's brother-in-law, Archibald, the fourth Earl of Douglas, who was offended with Rothesay for his unfaithfulness to his wife, the sister of Douglas. (David's father-in-law, the highly influential third Earl, had died two years before, in 1400.) The pretext for David's arrest was that the three-year period of his lieutenancy had expired. He was initially held captive in St Andrews Castle, and soon afterwards taken to Falkland Palace, Albany's residence in Fife. According to Bower, the prince spent the journey hooded and mounted backwards on a mule. At Falkland David remained a prisoner and shortly died there, reputedly of starvation.

He was buried at Lindores Abbey. The King founded a chaplaincy in the parish church of Dundee to pray for his soul, and daily masses were to be said at Deer Abbey and Culross. A few weeks after the funeral, in May 1402, a public enquiry into the circumstances of David's death exonerated Albany of all blame.

Four years later, in 1406, David's younger brother, James Stewart, succeeded Robert III as king (although at that time remaining uncrowned and in captivity in England) while Albany secured himself as de facto ruler of Scotland.

Fictional portrayals
David is the subject of an anonymous full-length 18th century verse drama, The Duke of Rothsay, a tragedy  published and sold in Edinburgh in 1780. The story of his imprisonment is the principal subject of Walter Scott's The Fair Maid of Perth (1828) in which he is likewise portrayed as tragic victim. He also features as a principal character in relevant novels from Nigel Tranter's trilogy about the early Stewart kings, The Stewart Trilogy (1976-1977).

Notes

Sources 

1378 births
1402 deaths
14th-century Scottish people
15th-century Scottish people
David Stewart, Duke of Rothesay
David Stewart, Duke of Rothesay
David
David Stewart, Duke of Rothesay
David Stewart, Duke of Rothesay
Dukes of Rothesay
Earls of Atholl
14th-century Scottish earls
15th-century Scottish peers
High Stewards of Scotland
People of Falkland Palace
Sons of kings